HMS Conqueror was a 68-gun third rate ship of the line of the Royal Navy, built by John Barnard and launched on 24 May 1758 at Harwich initially under command of Captain Robert Harland.  

Commanded by Captain William Lloyd in the Battle of Lagos.

While under the command of Lloyd, she was wrecked on the rocks of St Nicholas Island off Plymouth Sound on 26 October 1760.

Notes

References

Lavery, Brian (2003) The Ship of the Line – Volume 1: The development of the battlefleet 1650–1850. Conway Maritime Press. .

Ships of the line of the Royal Navy
1758 ships
Ships built in Harwich
Temple-class ships of the line
Maritime incidents in 1760